Salmon Hill is a hill between Salmon and Blackwelder Glaciers in Victoria Land. So named by Frank Debenham of the British Antarctic Expedition (1910–13) because of its sandy pink color due to a pink limestone.

Hills of Victoria Land
Scott Coast